Baldassarre Negroni (21 January 1877 – 18 July 1948) was an Italian film director and screenwriter. He directed 89 films between 1912 and 1936. He directed the 1932 film Due cuori felici, which starred Vittorio De Sica.

Selected filmography

 Pierrot the Prodigal (1914)
 The Lady of the Camellias (1915)
 The Courier of Moncenisio (1927)
 The Last Tsars (1928)
 Judith and Holofernes (1929)
 Two Happy Hearts (1932)
 Pergolesi (1932)
 Giallo (1933)
 Steel (1933)
 Bayonet (1936)
 The Ambassador (1936)

References

External links

1877 births
1948 deaths
Italian film directors
20th-century Italian screenwriters
Italian male screenwriters
Writers from Rome
20th-century Italian male writers